Jet4you served the following destinations:

* All flights are operated by Jetairfly

Lists of airline destinations